Bake Off Celebridades (English: Bake Off Celebrities) is a Brazilian reality television competition spin-off from the main series Bake Off Brasil featuring celebrities as contestants.

Host and judges
Key

Series overview

Ratings and reception

References

External links
 Bake Off Celebridades on SBT.com.br

2021 Brazilian television series debuts
2021 in Brazilian television
Reality television spin-offs
Brazil
Brazilian television series based on British television series
2022 Brazilian television series endings